The 1927 Loyola Ramblers football team was an American football team that represented Loyola University Chicago as an independent during the 1927 college football season. Led by Roger Kiley in his fifth season as head coach, the Ramblers compiled an overall record of 4–4.

Schedule

References

Loyola
Loyola Ramblers football seasons
Loyola Ramblers football